Khalid Ismaïl Mubarak (born 7 July 1965) is a UAE football (soccer) player who played as a midfielder for the United Arab Emirates national football team and Al-Nasr Club in Dubai. He played in the 1990 FIFA World Cup and scored the first World Cup goal for his country against West Germany.

While it has been reported that he received a Rolls-Royce car from the UAE royal family for his performance at the 1990 World Cup, Ismail stated in a 2010 interview that he never received one.

References

External links

1965 births
Living people
Emirati footballers
1988 AFC Asian Cup players
1990 FIFA World Cup players
1992 AFC Asian Cup players
United Arab Emirates international footballers
Al-Nasr SC (Dubai) players
UAE Pro League players
Association football midfielders
Footballers at the 1994 Asian Games
Asian Games competitors for the United Arab Emirates